The 1977 Australian Open (December) was a tennis tournament played on outdoor grass courts in Melbourne, Victoria, Australia. It was the 66th edition of the tournament and was held from 19 to 31 December 1977. Due to a scheduling change two Australian Opens took place in 1977 with the first taking place in January. Vitas Gerulaitis and Evonne Goolagong Cawley won the singles titles.

Seniors

Men's singles

 Vitas Gerulaitis defeated  John Lloyd, 6–3, 7–6, 5–7, 3–6, 6–2
It was Gerulaitis's 1st (and only) career Grand Slam title.

Women's singles

 Evonne Goolagong Cawley defeated  Helen Gourlay Cawley, 6–3, 6–0
It was Goolagong Cawley's 6th career Grand Slam title.

Men's doubles
 Ray Ruffels /  Allan Stone defeated  John Alexander /  Phil Dent, 7–6, 7–6

Women's doubles
 Evonne Goolagong Cawley /  Helen Gourlay Cawley vs.  Mona Schallau Guerrant /  Kerry Melville Reid, shared due to rained out final

Mixed doubles
Competition not held between 1970 and 1986.

Juniors

Boys' singles
 Ray Kelly

Girls' singles
 Amanda Tobin defeated  Leanne Harrison, 6–1, 6–2

References

 
 

 
 

 
1977 in Australian tennis
2
1977,Australian Open